Edward VII (1841–1910) was king of the United Kingdom and its dominions from 1901 to 1910.

Edward VII may also refer to:
HMS King Edward VII, a British battleship
Edward the Seventh, a television series
 King Edward VII Land, Antarctica
 King Edward VII School, Sheffield

See also
Eduardo VII Park, a park in Lisbon
King Edward VII Hospital (disambiguation), various hospitals of this name